Indonesian Crude Price, or ICP, is a price index for crude oil from Indonesia.

The ICP is determined by Dirjen Migas, based on moving average spot price of a basket of eight internationally traded Indonesia crudes:
 Minas
 Cinta
 Duri
 Arjuna
 Attaka
 Widuri
 Belida
 Senipah

In some cases ICP is used as index in long term LNG contracts in East Asia.

References

 

Benchmark crude oils
Petroleum in Indonesia